The women's 100 metres event at the 2007 Pan American Games was held on July 23–24.

Medalists

Results

Heats
Qualification: First 3 of each heat (Q) and the next 4 fastest (q) qualified for the semifinals.

Wind:Heat 1: +2.1 m/s, Heat 2: +0.6 m/s, Heat 3: +2.2 m/s, Heat 4: +0.9 m/s

Semifinals
Qualification: First 4 of each semifinal (Q) qualified directly for the final.

Wind:Heat 1: +0.6 m/s, Heat 2: +0.1 m/s

Final
Wind: +0.8 m/s

References
Official results

100
2007
2007 in women's athletics